Kenneth E. Reeves (born 1951) is an American politician who served as the mayor of Cambridge, Massachusetts, United States, from 1992 to 1995 and again from 2006 to 2007. Reeves is the first openly gay African-American man to have served as mayor of any city in the United States.

Early life and education 
Reeves was born to Jamaican parents in Detroit, Michigan. Reeves attended Detroit's public schools, graduating from Cass Technical High School in 1968. After one year at Trinity College in Hartford, Connecticut, Reeves transferred to Harvard University. At Harvard, Reeves would meet his longtime partner, Gregory Johnson.

Reeves earned his degree in American history and literature from Harvard 1973. In 1976, Reeves graduated from the University of Michigan Law School.

Political career

Cambridge politics 
Reeves was elected Mayor of Cambridge in January 1994. Cambridge's elections are non-partisan, but he identifies himself with the Democratic Party. While mayor, he was a member of the Mayors Against Illegal Guns Coalition, an organization formed in 2006 and co-chaired by New York City mayor Michael Bloomberg and Boston mayor Thomas Menino.

Reeves stopped paying the annual fee to the Massachusetts Bar in 1998 and therefore is suspended from practicing law. He stated that he does not see the logic in paying the Bar while he is not actively practicing law.

Reeves was succeeded as mayor in 2008 by E. Denise Simmons, who became the first openly lesbian African-American mayor in the United States.

State politics 
In the 2006 Massachusetts election, Reeves endorsed the gubernatorial campaign of Deval Patrick, a "longtime friend" of Reeves. Reeves additionally endorsed Tim Murray in the Democratic primary for Lieutenant Governor. In 2014, Reeves endorsed fellow Cambridge resident Leland Cheung's campaign for Lieutenant Governor.

See also
 List of first African-American mayors
 List of the first LGBT holders of political offices
 List of mayors and city managers of Cambridge, Massachusetts
 2013 Cambridge, Massachusetts municipal election

References

External links
City of Cambridge: Office of the Mayor Official Site
Interview with P.O.V  PBS
Mayors Against Illegal Guns homepage

1951 births
Living people
African-American mayors in Massachusetts
American politicians of Jamaican descent
Gay politicians
Harvard College alumni
LGBT African Americans
LGBT mayors of places in the United States
LGBT people from Massachusetts
Massachusetts city council members
Mayors of Cambridge, Massachusetts
University of Michigan Law School alumni
21st-century African-American people
African-American lawyers
20th-century African-American people